Michael Brennan (1884 – 6 October 1970) was an Irish politician who served as a Teachta Dála (TD) for fifteen years for the Roscommon constituency.

A farmer, Brennan stood unsuccessfully at the 1923 general election as a Farmers' Party candidate. He was first elected as an independent TD at the June 1927 general election and returned at the September 1927 general election.

Brennan joined Cumann na nGaedheal in 1932, but lost his seat at the 1932 general election. He was returned at the 1933 general election, and re-elected at the 1937 and 1938 general elections. He lost his seat at the 1943 general election, and stood again unsuccessfully as a Fine Gael candidate at the 1944 general election.

He stood as an independent candidate at the 1948 general election, and for Fine Gael at the 1951 general election, but was unsuccessful on both occasions.

References

1884 births
1970 deaths
Fine Gael TDs
Cumann na nGaedheal TDs
Independent TDs
Members of the 5th Dáil
Members of the 6th Dáil
Members of the 8th Dáil
Members of the 9th Dáil
Members of the 10th Dáil
20th-century Irish farmers
Politicians from County Roscommon